State Road 64 (SR 64) extends from City Road 789 (former County Road 789) near the Gulf of Mexico in Holmes Beach on Anna Maria Island in Manatee County to US 27/US 98 in Avon Park in Highlands County. State Road 64 travels from west to east through the counties of Manatee, Hardee and Highlands. It is a mostly rural two-lane highway going through only two cities, Bradenton and Zolfo Springs. It crosses the Gulf Intracoastal Waterway as well as the Braden River, Lake Manatee, and the Myakka River. East of Avon Park, a bi-county extension runs northeast into Polk County which runs through Lake Wales Ridge State Forest and terminates at the Avon Park US Air Force Base. It is designated as the Florida Cracker Trail from Bradenton to the Hardee County Line.

Major intersections

Bridges

Anna Maria Island Bridge
The Anna Maria Island Bridge is a double-leaf bascule bridge that crosses the Sarasota Bay, connecting the barrier islands of Holmes Beach to the mainland of Palma Sola, Florida. Built in 1957, the bridge carries Manatee Avenue, part of SR 64, and it also replaced the old swing bridge built in 1921.

The bridge was designated by the 1965 Legislature of Florida.

Related roads

County Road 64 in Highlands and Polk Counties

County Road 64 is a bi-county extension of SR 64 in Highlands and Polk Counties. It begins at SR 17 in Avon Park as East Main Street, which is part of SR 17 from the eastern terminus of SR 64. From there it runs straight west and east until the intersection with East Avon Pines Road, where it branches to the northeast, a position it maintains throughout the rest of the county. After crossing a bridge over Bonnet Creek, it crosses the Polk County Line thus entering part of the Lake Wales Ridge State Forest, before curving east as it approaches a bridge over Arbuckle Creek, and terminating at the Avon Park Air Force Range.

County Road 64A in Hardee County

County Road 64A is an alternate county route of SR 64. It begins as a north-south road at the intersection with SR 64 in Oak Grove west of Zolfo Springs, and begins to curve to the northeast at the intersection of Alton Carlton Road, which leads to the Wauchula Municipal Airport. By the time it reaches the intersection of CR 35B, it runs directly west and east like its parent route and enters the City of Wauchula. Here, the road's only major intersection is CR 35A before it finally terminates at the intersection of US 17 and SR 636.

References

External links

Florida Route Log (SR 64)

064
064
064
064
064
064